A number of units of measurement were used in Honduras for length, mass, volume etc. In Honduras, the metric system was adopted in 1910, and has been compulsory since 1912, under a joint convention between Costa Rica, Guatemala, Honduras, Nicaragua and El Salvador.

Pre-metric units

Before the introduction of the metric system, a number of modified Spanish (Castilian), English and local units were used, and continue to be used today by a large part of the country.

Length
A number of units were used to measure length. One vara was equal to 0.836 m. Some other units are given below:

1 cuarta =  vara

1 tercia =  vara

1 mecate = 24 varas.

1 legua = 5,000 varas

Area

The manzana was used by farmers to measure land area. For large areas, land was customarily measured in labors or legua.

1 manzana = 10,000 vara2 =  1.727 acres = 6,989 m2 ≈ .7 hectare

1 labor = 1 million vara2

1 legua = 25 labors = 25 million vara2

Mass

Several units were used to measure mass in Costa Rica, Guatemala, Honduras, Nicaragua and El Salvador. Some units are given below:

1 caja = 16 kg

1 quintal = 100 libras ≈ 46 kg ≈ 101.4 lbs 

1 carga = 2 quintals ≈ 200 lbs ≈ 90.72 kg

Volume

Several units were used to measure capacity in Costa Rica, Guatemala, Honduras, Nicaragua and El Salvador. 

1 botella = 0.63 to 0.67 L.

1 cajuela = 16.6 L.

1 cuartillo varies between countries, but defined as 4 octavillos or 1/4 almude and contains 1.156 L ≈ 1.222 qt(US) (liquid) ≈ 1.017 qt(Imp)

1 fanega = 12 almudes = 48 cuartillos ≈ 55.50 L ≈ 1.960 ft3 (1.575 U.S. bushels)

Notes

References

Honduran culture
Honduras